Iron rail can refer to:

Early wagonway rails made of cast or wrought iron, see Iron rails (wagonways)
Iron or steel railway rails see Rail (railway)
Iron Rail Book Collective, a radical library in New Orleans, USA